Anthene pitmani, the Pitman's hairtail, is a butterfly in the family Lycaenidae. It is found in Ethiopia, Somalia and Kenya. The habitat consists of savanna.

The larvae feed on the young shoots of Acacia abyssinica, Acacia lahai, Acacia stenocarpa and Dichrostachys species. They are associated with the ant species Crematogaster gerstaeckeri. The larvae are dark yellow green with diagonal yellow lateral stripes and a yellow edging around the collar.

Subspecies
Anthene pitmani pitmani (central, western and northern Kenya, Ethiopia)
Anthene pitmani somalina Stempffer, 1936 (Somalia)

References

Butterflies described in 1936
Anthene